Coleophora occitana is a moth of the family Coleophoridae. It is found in France and Italy.

References

occitana
Moths described in 1989
Moths of Europe